Appleseed may refer to:
 The seed of an apple
 Johnny Appleseed (1774–1845), American pioneer nurseryman and missionary
 Appleseed (EP), by Aesop Rock
 Appleseed, a novel by John Clute
 The Apple Seed, a storytelling radio show on BYU radio

Organizations
 Appleseed Foundation, a non-profit network of social justice centers
 Project Appleseed, a rifle marksmanship clinic
 Appleseed Recordings, a record label

Manga and spin-offs
 Appleseed (manga), written and illustrated by Masamune Shirow
 Appleseed (1988 film), a 1988 original video animation based on the manga
 Appleseed (2004 film), a 2004 film
 Appleseed EX, a February 2007 video game adaptation of the film
 Appleseed Ex Machina, an October 2007 film  sequel to the 2004 film
 Appleseed XIII, a 2011 CGI anime television series
 Appleseed Alpha, a 2014 film